PNC Center may refer to:
PNC Center (Cincinnati), a building in Cincinnati, Ohio
PNC Center (Cleveland), a building in Cleveland, Ohio, the former headquarters of National City
 Hyatt Regency Indianapolis, a mixed use building in Indianapolis, Indiana also known as the PNC Center
PNC Center (Fort Lauderdale), formerly National City Center a building in Fort Lauderdale, Florida